Piz Üertsch is a mountain of the Albula Alps, overlooking the Albula Pass, in the Swiss canton of Graubünden. It is located south-west of Piz Kesch.

References

External links
 Piz Üertsch on Hikr
 Piz Üertsch on Summitpost

Mountains of Graubünden
Mountains of the Alps
Alpine three-thousanders
Mountains of Switzerland
Bergün Filisur
La Punt Chamues-ch